The men's coxless four competition at the 1968 Summer Olympics took place at Virgilio Uribe Rowing and Canoeing Course, Mexico.

Competition format

This rowing competition consisted of two main rounds (heats and finals), as well as a repechage round that allowed teams that did not win their heats to advance to the final. All races were 2,000 metres in distance.

 Heats: Two heats. With 11 boats entered, there were five or six boats per heat. The top boat in each heat (total of 2 boats) advanced directly to the final; all other boats (9 boats) went to the repechage.
 Repechage: Two heats. There were four or five boats in each heat. The top two boats in each heat (total of 4 boats) advanced to the final. The remaining boats (5 boats) were sent to a 7th–11th place classification race.
 Finals: A main final and a 7th–12th place classification race.

Results

Heats

Heat 1

Heat 2

Repechage

Repechage heat 1

Repechage heat 2

Finals

Classification 7–11

Final

References

Rowing at the 1968 Summer Olympics